Samuel A. Elbert (April 9, 1832 - July 15, 1902) was a doctor and politician in Indiana. He was the Republican nominee for a state house seat in 1882. He was the first African American to receive an M.D. degree in Indiana.

He was born in Maryland to parents who were not enslaved. He worked as a servant and studied at Oberlin College. He moved to Indianapolis in 1866 and taught at a private school for African Americans supported by the Allen Chapel. He studied medicine with two doctors and enrolled at Indiana Medical College in 1869. After a dispute he was degreed by the college in 1871, appointed to the state board of health, and established a private medical practice.

He won the Republican nomination for a state house seat over incumbent James Sidney Hinton. He and other Republicans lost in the state’s general election.

He married and had six children. He was a prominent A.M.E. Church member. He died at his home at 512 North Senate Avenue. In 2013 a grave marker was added at Crown Hill Cemetery for Elbert.

References

External links

African-American physicians
Oberlin College alumni
People from Maryland
Politicians from Indianapolis
19th-century American politicians
19th-century American physicians
Physicians from Indiana
19th-century African-American politicians
1902 deaths
Indiana Republicans
1832 births
African-American Methodists
Schoolteachers from Indiana
Methodists from Indiana
African-American schoolteachers
Free people of color
19th-century American educators
19th-century African-American educators